Fourche was one of a dozen s built for the French Navy in the first decade of the 20th century. During the First World War, she escorted the battle fleet during the Battle of Antivari off the coast of Montenegro in August 1914 and escorted multiple convoys to Montenegro for the rest of the year. Fourche protected the evacuation of the Royal Serbian Army from Durazzo, Albania, in February 1916. The ship was sunk by an Austro-Hungarian submarine in June with the loss of 19 crewmen.

Design and description
The Boucliers were the first class of destroyers designed in response to a new doctrine for their use. Nearly double the size of previous classes and more powerfully armed, they were built to a general specification and each shipyard was allowed to determine the best way to meet that specification. Their crew numbered 4 officers and 77 men.

The sisters were powered by a pair of Rateau steam turbines, each driving one propeller shaft using steam provided by four du Temple boilers.

The primary armament of the Bouclier-class ships consisted of two  Modèle 1893 guns in single mounts, one each fore and aft of the superstructure, and four  Modèle 1902 guns distributed amidships. They were also fitted with two twin mounts for  torpedo tubes amidships, one on each broadside.

Construction and career
Fourche was ordered on 26 August 1908 as part of the 1908 naval program from Établissement de la Brosse et Fouché. She was laid down at the company's shipyard at Nantes, Brittany, in 1909. The ship was launched on 21 October 1910 and transferred to Lorient on 13 May 1911 in preparation for her sea trials. Fourche was commissioned for her trials on 20 July and fully commissioned on 4 December 1911. The ship arrived at Toulon on 24 March 1912 and was assigned to the 1st Destroyer Flotilla of the 1st Naval Army on 1 April. Shortly after the start of the First World War, the flotilla escorted the battle fleet during the Battle of Antivari on 16 August and when they bombarded the Austro-Hungarian naval base at Cattaro, Montenegro, on 1 September. Four days later, the fleet covered the evacuation of Danilo, Crown Prince of Montenegro, to the Greek island of Corfu. The flotilla escorted multiple small convoys loaded with supplies and equipment to Antivari (now known as Bar), Montenegro, beginning in October and lasting for the rest of the year, always covered by the larger ships of the Naval Army in futile attempts to lure the Austro-Hungarian fleet into battle.

The first convoy of 1915 to Antivari arrived on 11 January and more were made until the last one on 20–21 April. After Italy signed the Treaty of London and declared war on the Austro-Hungarian Empire on 23 May, the ship was transferred to the 1st Destroyer Flotilla in December which was assigned to the 1st Division of Destroyers and Submarines of the 2nd Squadron based at Brindisi, Italy.

Fourche covered the evacuation of the Royal Serbian Army from Durrazo on 23–26 February 1916 and was unsuccessfully attacked by the Austro-Hungarian submarine  on 24 April. The destroyer was part of the covering force for an attack on the Albanian port of Medova by two Italian MAS boats on the night of 15/16 June. Although the ship broke in half only 19 men were killed when she sank at  coordinates .

References

Bibliography

 

Bouclier-class destroyers
Ships built in France
1910 ships
Maritime incidents in 1916
Ships sunk by Austro-Hungarian submarines
World War I shipwrecks in the Adriatic Sea